Janric Fraser Craig, 3rd Viscount Craigavon (born 9 June 1944), is a British peer and chartered accountant. He is one of the 92 hereditary peers elected to remain in the House of Lords after the passing of the House of Lords Act 1999; he sits as a crossbencher.

The son of The 2nd Viscount Craigavon, he was born into a famous Ulster family and was educated at Eton College, Berkshire, and at the University of London, where he graduated with a Bachelor of Arts and a Bachelor of Science. In 1974, he succeeded to his father's titles. Lord Craigavon is a member of the Executive Committee of the Anglo-Austrian Society. He was made a Commander of the Order of the Lion of Finland in 1998, a Commander of the Swedish Royal Order of the Polar Star in the following year and a Knight of the Danish Order of the Dannebrog in 2006.

Craig is a former trustee of the Progress Educational Trust, and is now an advisor for the Trust. He is a patron of Humanists UK, sitting in the Parliamentary Humanists group.

Arms

References

External links

1944 births
Living people
People educated at Eton College
Commanders of the Order of the Lion of Finland
Order of the Polar Star
Viscounts in the Peerage of the United Kingdom
Crossbench hereditary peers
Alumni of the University of London
Knights of the Order of the Dannebrog
Commanders of the Order of the Polar Star

Hereditary peers elected under the House of Lords Act 1999